
The following lists events that happened during 1807 in South Africa.

Events
 British ban slave trade and the importation of slaves to the Cape ends.
 17 January - Henry George Grey is appointed as acting Governor of the Cape.
 22 May - Du Pré Alexander, Earl of Caledon is appointed Governor of the Cape.

References
See Years in South Africa for list of References

History of South Africa